Roberto Solórzano (26 April 1945 – 30 January 2022) was a Costa Rican judoka. He competed in the men's half-heavyweight event at the 1972 Summer Olympics.

References

1945 births
2022 deaths
Costa Rican male judoka
Olympic judoka of Costa Rica
Judoka at the 1972 Summer Olympics
People from Alajuela